The BNXT League Dutch Play-offs is the concluding elimination tournament part of the BNXT League, which determines the Dutch national basketball champions. The playoffs were introduced in the 1977–78 season, modelled after the American National Basketball Association (NBA) which already used the system. The playoffs were part of the Eredivisie (later the Dutch Basketball League) until 2021, when they became part of the BNXT League, which is a fusion league with Belgium.

The play-offs generally commence in May and finish in June or July.

Formats
Several different formats have been used of the existence of the playoffs.

1977–1982

1982–1992 
In 1982, the finals were expanded to a best-of-five series.

1993–2015, 2018–2019 
From 1993 to 2015, eight teams qualified for the playoffs each year. The quarterfinals were a best-of-three, the semifinals a best-of-five, and the finals a best-of-seven.

2015–2018 
Because the number of teams in 2014 was reduced to nine, the number of teams qualifying for the playoffs was reduced as well. The semi-finals became a best-of-seven series as well.

2020–2021 
In 2020, the quarter-finals were played in a two-legged series with the team with the most aggregated points winning. The finals were shortened to a best-of-five.

2021–present 
Since 2021, under the umbrella of the BNXT League. Teams are ranked based on their standings in the Elite Gold and the Elite Silver.

List of playoff series 
This is a listing of Dutch national basketball playoffs series, grouped by club. Bolded years indicate wins, underlined years are finals. Years in italics indicate series in progress. Tables are sorted first by the number of series, then the number of wins, and then by year of first occurrence.

Donar

ZZ Leiden

Heroes Den Bosch

Recent finals

Numbers in brackets after team names refer to the seed as which they came into the playoffs.

Performance by team

References

Dutch Basketball League playoffs